Klinkhamer is a Dutch occupational surname for a blacksmith. Notable people with this name include:
Adriënne Broeckman-Klinkhamer (1876–1976), Dutch painter, illustrator, and textile artist
Jacob Frederik Klinkhamer (1854–1928), Dutch architect
Richard Klinkhamer (1937–2016), Dutch murderer

References

Dutch-language surnames
Occupational surnames